The Embassy of Madagascar in Washington, D.C. is the diplomatic mission of the  Republic of Madagascar to the United States. It is located at 2374 Massachusetts Avenue, Northwest, Washington, D.C., in the Embassy Row neighborhood.

The current Chargé d'Affaires, Chief of Mission is Amielle Pelenne NIRINIAVISOA MARCEDA.

References

External links

Official website
wikimapia

Madagascar
Washington, D.C.
Madagascar–United States relations
Madagascar